The 1953 Connecticut Huskies football team represented the University of Connecticut in the 1953 college football season.  The Huskies were led by second year head coach Bob Ingalls, and completed the season with a record of 3–4–1.  For the first time, home games were played at Memorial Stadium, which replaced the Gardner Dow Athletic Fields as the Huskies' home venue.

Schedule

References

Connecticut
UConn Huskies football seasons
Connecticut Huskies football